Jeremy Nicholas may refer to:
 Jeremy Nicholas (writer) (born 1947), writer, journalist, actor and composer
 Jeremy Nicholas (broadcaster), broadcaster, writer, speaker and journalist